Songs Our Daddy Taught Us (1958) is the second studio album by American singing duo the Everly Brothers. The album is based on a selection of songs that the brothers learned as boys from their father, Ike Everly. Originally released on Cadence Records, the album has been re-released on LP and CD many times, primarily by Rhino and EMI.

Reception

Music journalist Richie Unterberger notes that the album of traditional music, released at the peak of the duo's commercial success as a rock and roll act, was unexpected and "ahead of its time". Rolling Stone, which awarded the album 4 out of 5 stars, noted that not even Elvis Presley "had the nerve to do an album as rootsy" as this one.

Track listing
"Roving Gambler" (Terry Gilkyson) – 3:41
"Down in the Willow Garden" (Charlie Monroe, traditional) – 3:04
"Long Time Gone" (Frank Hartford, Tex Ritter, traditional) – 2:26
"Lightning Express" (attributed to Bradley Kincaid; actually written as "Please, Mr. Conductor, Don't Put Me Off the Train" by J. Fred Helf and E. P. Moran) – 4:53
"That Silver Haired Daddy of Mine" (Gene Autry, Jimmy Long) – 3:09
"Who's Gonna Shoe Your Pretty Little Feet?" (traditional) – 2:41
"Barbara Allen" (traditional) – 4:41
"Oh So Many Years" (Frankie Bailes) – 2:37
"I'm Here to Get My Baby Out of Jail" (Karl Davis, Harty Taylor) – 3:38
"Rockin' Alone (In an Old Rockin' Chair)" (Bob Miller) – 3:01
"Kentucky" (Karl Davis, credited to Henry Prichard) – 3:10
"Put My Little Shoes Away" (Samuel N. Mitchell, Charles E. Pratt) – 3:21

Personnel
Don Everly – guitar, vocals
Phil Everly – guitar, vocals
Floyd Chance – upright bass

Legacy

In 2013, Green Day frontman Billie Joe Armstrong and jazz singer Norah Jones recorded a remake of the album, titled Foreverly. It was released on November 25, 2013.

References

The Everly Brothers albums
1958 albums
Cadence Records albums
Concept albums
Albums produced by Archie Bleyer